Dominika Kopcik (born 27 October 1988 in Toronto, Ontario) is a Canadian synchronized swimmer. She began synchronized swimming at age 10. At 14 she became a national champion, earning her a spot to compete in the Canada Games 2003 where she won in three categories. By the next spring, she again won National championships and made her first Canadian National team. Kopcik would then go off to compete at the 2004 Fina Junior World championships.

Following that summer at the age of 15, she became Canada’s youngest member to ever make the Canadian National Olympic team. She secured her place by becoming flyer of the team alongside duet partner.  Over the next 4 years she went on to compete for Team Canada at the 2005 FINA World Championships, 2007 Pan American Games, 2008 Beijing Olympic Games.

 2002 Canada National Champion
 1st Place Solo Competition
 1st Place Duet Competition
 1st Place Combination Team

 2003 Canada Summer Games
 1st Place Solo Competition
 1st Place Duet Competition
 1st Place Combination Team

 2004 Canada National Champion
 1st Place Solo Competition
 1st Place Duet Competition
 1st Place Combination Team

 2004 FINA Junior World Championships
 4th Place Team Free and Technical

 2005 FINA World Championships
 4th Place Team Free and Technical
 4th Place Combination Team

 2007 Pan American Games
 2nd Place Team Free and Technical

 2007 Japan Open
 4th Place Duet Free and Technical 
 4th Place Team Free and Technical

 2008 Olympic Games
 4th Place Team Free and Technical

References

1988 births
Living people
Canadian synchronized swimmers
Olympic synchronized swimmers of Canada
Swimmers from Toronto
Synchronized swimmers at the 2008 Summer Olympics
Synchronized swimmers at the 2007 Pan American Games
Pan American Games competitors for Canada